Gerard Carlier (23 February 1917 – 1 February 1995) was a Dutch athlete. He competed in the men's high jump at the 1936 Summer Olympics.

References

1917 births
1995 deaths
Athletes (track and field) at the 1936 Summer Olympics
Dutch male high jumpers
Olympic athletes of the Netherlands
Place of birth missing